The 1991 Calder Cup playoffs of the American Hockey League began on April 2, 1991. Ten teams, five from each division, qualified for the playoffs. The top three teams in each division received a bye for the preliminary round while the fourth- and fifth-placed teams in each division played a two-game series with the winners advancing to the Division Semifinals; if each team won one game, the series winner was decided in sudden-death "super overtime" immediately following Game 2. The eight remaining teams then played best-of-seven series for Division Semifinals and Division Finals. The division champions played a best-of-seven series for the Calder Cup. The Calder Cup Final ended on May 24, 1991, with the Springfield Indians defeating the Rochester Americans four games to two to win the Calder Cup for the second consecutive year, and the seventh and final time in team history. This was a rematch of the 1990 Calder Cup Final where Springfield defeated Rochester four games to two.  Similarly, a Springfield goaltender—this time Kay Whitmore -- won the Jack A. Butterfield Trophy as the MVP of the playoffs.

Playoff seeds
After the 1990–91 AHL regular season, the top five teams from each division qualified for the playoffs. The Rochester Americans finished the regular season with the best overall record.

Northern Division
Springfield Indians - 96 points
Cape Breton Oilers - 90 points
Moncton Hawks - 84 points
Fredericton Canadiens - 81 points
Maine Mariners - 80 points

Southern Division
Rochester Americans - 99 points
Binghamton Rangers - 94 points
Baltimore Skipjacks - 85 points
Hershey Bears - 78 points
Adirondack Red Wings - 76 points

Bracket

In the preliminary round, the fourth-placed team is the home team for both games of the two-game series. In each subsequent round, the team that earned more points during the regular season receives home ice advantage, meaning they receive the "extra" game on home-ice if the series reaches the maximum number of games. There is no set series format due to arena scheduling conflicts and travel considerations.

Preliminary round
Note: Home team is listed first.

Northern Division

(4) Fredericton Canadiens vs. (5) Maine Mariners

Southern Division

(4) Hershey Bears vs. (5) Adirondack Red Wings

Division Semifinals

Northern Division

(1) Springfield Indians vs. (4) Fredericton Canadiens

(2) Cape Breton Oilers vs. (3) Moncton Hawks

Southern Division

(1) Rochester Americans vs. (4) Hershey Bears

(2) Binghamton Rangers vs. (3) Baltimore Skipjacks

Division Finals

Northern Division

(1) Springfield Indians vs. (3) Moncton Hawks

Southern Division

(1) Rochester Americans vs. (2) Binghamton Rangers

Calder Cup Final

(S1) Rochester Americans vs. (N1) Springfield Indians

See also
1990–91 AHL season
List of AHL seasons

References

Calder Cup
Calder Cup playoffs